Hinzpeter is a surname. Notable people with the surname include:

Georg Ernst Hinzpeter (1827–1907), German pedagogue
Jürgen Hinzpeter (1937–2016), German reporter
Rodrigo Hinzpeter (born 1965), Chilean lawyer and politician

See also
Heinz Peter (disambiguation)